Chernukhino is a rural locality (a village) in Kubenskoye Rural Settlement, Kharovsky District, Vologda Oblast, Russia. The population was 19 as of 2002.

Geography 
Chernukhino is located 12 km northwest of Kharovsk (the district's administrative centre) by road. Filinskoye is the nearest rural locality.

References 

Rural localities in Kharovsky District